The 2019 New Orleans Bowl was a college football bowl game played on December 21, 2019, with kickoff at 9:00 p.m. EST (8:00 p.m. local CST) on ESPN. It was the 19th edition of the New Orleans Bowl, and one of the 2019–20 bowl games concluding the 2019 FBS football season. Sponsored by freight shipping company R+L Carriers, the game was officially known as the R+L Carriers New Orleans Bowl.

Teams
The game was played between the Sun Belt Conference champions Appalachian State Mountaineers and the UAB Blazers of Conference USA (C–USA).  It was the first New Orleans Bowl to feature a ranked team, as Appalachian State entered the game at No. 20 in the AP Poll, Coaches Poll, and CFP rankings. It also was the first time that UAB and Appalachian State ever played each other.

Appalachian State Mountaineers

Appalachian State entered the New Orleans Bowl with an overall 12–1 record (7–1 in conference), having won the Sun Belt Championship Game over Louisiana. This was Appalachian State's second New Orleans Bowl, both consecutively and overall; the Mountaineers entered the game as the defending New Orleans Bowl champions, having won the 2018 edition over Middle Tennessee, 45–13.

UAB Blazers

UAB entered the bowl with a 9–4 record (6–2 in conference). The Blazers finished tied with Louisiana Tech atop C–USA's West Division, then lost the C–USA Championship Game to Florida Atlantic, 49–6.

Game summary

Statistics

References

External links

Game statistics at statbroadcast.com

New Orleans Bowl
New Orleans Bowl
New Orleans Bowl
New Orleans Bowl
Appalachian State Mountaineers football bowl games
UAB Blazers football bowl games